UNIMA is the Union Internationale de la Marionnette - International Puppetry Association.

Unima is a Madagascan company.

UNIMA may also refer to:
University of Malawi, Malawi
Manado State University, Indonesia